Mohamed El Amine Aouad (born September 20, 1984 in El Bayadh) is an Algerian footballer. He currently plays for ASM Oran in the Algerian Ligue 2.

Club career 
On June 28, 2009, Aouad signed a two-year contract with CR Belouizdad, joining them on a free transfer from Emirati-side Hatta Club.

On July 5, 2016, Aouad signed his come back, a two-year contract with MC Oran after played with the club in the 2012-14 seasons.

References

External links
 DZFoot Profile
 

1984 births
Living people
People from El Bayadh
Algerian footballers
Algerian Ligue Professionnelle 1 players
Algerian expatriate footballers
ASM Oran players
CR Belouizdad players
MC Oran players
USM El Harrach players
Expatriate footballers in the United Arab Emirates
Algerian expatriate sportspeople in the United Arab Emirates
Association football midfielders
21st-century Algerian people